This is a list of Panamanian people who are famous or notable and were either born in Panama or have Panamanian ancestry.

Artists 

Alfredo Sinclair, painter
 Alicia Viteri, painter
 Antonio Jose Guzman, artist
 Carlos Francisco Chang Marín, folk artist
 Chafil Cheucarama, Wounaan carver, illustrator, and painter
 José Luis Rodríguez Pittí, poet, artist
 Olga Sinclair, painter
 Pablo Runyan, painter

Beauty queens and fashion models
Ester Cordet, former Playboy Playmate of the Month
Justine Pasek, former Miss Universe
Rachel Smith, former Miss USA

Business
Ursula M. Burns, CEO of Xerox
Pedro Heilbron, CEO of Copa Airlines
Karl Kani, urban fashion designer (Panamanian father)

Entertainment
Erika Ender, musician/composer
Sharon Aguilar, musician/composer
Akinyele, rapper (Panamanian mother)
Tatyana Ali, actress (Panamanian mother)
Pedro Altamiranda, singer/composer
Lord Panamá, calypso singer and composer
Tony Moro, bolero and chachacha singer
Nancy Ames, singer
Tanya Aparicio, pianist
Tyson Beckford, model (maternal grandmother born in Panama)
Aloe Blacc, singer
Pop Smoke, rapper (Panamanian father)
Rubén Blades, singer, actor, former Minister of Tourism
Miguel Bosé, Spanish actor and singer (born in Panama)
Jordana Brewster, actress
Rod Carrillo, house and Latin music producer, label owner (born in Panama)
Casanova, rapper
Billy Cobham, drummer, for Mahavishnu Orchestra
Melissa De Sousa, actress (film The Best Man)
Edgardo Diaz, music producer (Menudo) (born in Panama)
La Factoría, Spanish reggae duo
Flex, Spanish reggae artist
Gaitanes, singers, musical producers, composers
Carlos Garnett, jazz saxophonist
El General, Spanish reggae artist
Margarita Henríquez, singer
Lori Heuring, actress
Clark Kent, rap music producer
Vincent Laresca, actor
Eddy Lover, Spanish reggae artist
Makano, Spanish reggae artist
Jaime Murrell, singer
Uncle Murda, rapper
Nando Boom, reggae artist
Danilo Pérez, jazz pianist, producer, composer
José Quintero, Broadway director
Los Rabanes, reggae-rock band
J. August Richards, actor
Coco Rodriguez, singer, actress
José Luis Rodríguez Vélez, orchestra director, clarinetist, composer
Daphne Rubin-Vega, actress and singer
Samy y Sandra Sandoval, singer, musician
Pop Smoke, rapper
DJ Spinna, record producer and DJ (Panamanian roots)
Alexis Texas, American adult film actress
Tessa Thompson, actress and singer (Panamanian father)
Aaron Zebede, actor, director and producer.
Sech, singer, rapper, songwriter, and produce
Hansen, Youtuber

Historical figures
Bayano, rebel slave
Floyd Britton, political dissident
Edward Ashton Gaskin Stuart, educator and labor leader
Victoriano Lorenzo, patriot
Juan Materno Vásquez de León, lawyer and professor 
Luis Anderson McNeil, former labor minister
Belisario Porras, former president
Urracá, chieftain
Jason Pace, 2019 World Champion donut eater

Journalism
Escolastico Calvo, journalist
Gwen Ifill, television correspondent and host
Gustavo Adolfo Mellander, academic journalist, 13 books and 400 articles
Juan Williams, television correspondent

Literature
Rosa María Britton, writer
Carlos Fuentes, Mexican writer (born in Panama)
Gloria Guardia, novelist and essayist
Ricardo Miró, poet
Rogelio Sinán, poet and writer
José Luis Rodríguez Pittí, writer
Consuelo Tomás, writer

Politics
Arnulfo Arias Madrid, former president
Harmodio Arias Madrid, former president
Nicolás Ardito Barletta, former president
Guillermo Endara, former president
Adrian Fenty, former mayor of Washington, D.C. (Panamanian father)
Esteban Huertas, independence fighter
Jorge Illueca, diplomat and politician
Julio E. Linares, former Treasury Minister (1963–1964) and Foreign Minister (1989–1993)
Ricardo Martinelli, former president
John McCain, American politician, member of the United States Senate, and 2008 presidential nominee
Mireya Moscoso, former president
Norberto Navarro, Minister of Public Works under three presidents, 1940s-50s. Founded the PRI party. 
Manuel Antonio Noriega, former dictator
Ernesto Pérez Balladares, former president
Belisario Porras, former president
Dudley Thompson, Jamaican Pan-Africanist, politician and diplomat
Martín Torrijos Espino, former president
Omar Torrijos, former dictator

Sports
Edwin Aguilar, soccer player
Pedro Alcazar, world boxing champion
Michael Amir Murillo, soccer player
Andrés Andrade Cedeño, soccer player
Felipe Baloy, soccer player
Édgar Bárcenas, soccer player
Leonardo Barker, professional football player
Reginald Beckford, sprinter
William Bedford, former basketball player
Juan Berenguer, professional baseball player
Rolando Blackman, former basketball player
Panama Al Brown, world boxing champion, first Hispanic world champion in history
Johan Camargo, professional baseball player 
Rod Carew, professional baseball player
Lorenzo Charles, professional basketball player (Panamanian parents)
Bruce Chen, professional baseball player
Eileen Coparropa, Olympic swimmer
Roberto Corbin, soccer player
Manuel Corpas, professional baseball player
Ed Cota, basketball player
Harold Cummings, soccer player
Kevin Daley, basketball player and Harlem Globetrotter
Frank Davis, professional football player
Jorge Dely Valdés, soccer player
Einar Díaz, professional baseball player
Roberto Durán, world boxing champion
Gabriel Enrique Gómez, soccer player
Luis Ernesto Tapia
Rommel Fernández, soccer player
Gary Forbes, professional basketball player
Alfonso Frazer, world champion boxer
Rubén Garcés, former basketball player
Aníbal Godoy, soccer player
Stuart Gray, professional basketball player
Reggie Grenald, professional basketball player
Carlos Harvey, soccer player
Darius Holland, professional football player
George Headley, cricket player
Leroy Jackson, professional basketball player
Guillermo Jones, professional boxer
Bayano Kamani, track and field athlete
Roberto Kelly, baseball player
Kevin Kurányi, German soccer player
Lloyd La Beach, first Olympic medal winner from Panama
Bobby Lashley, professional wrestler and former mixed martial arts fighter
Carlos Lee, professional baseball player
Héctor López, professional baseball player
Jorge Luján, boxer
José Macías, professional baseball player
Ernesto Marcel, professional boxer
Ramiro Mendoza, professional baseball player
Orlando Miller, professional baseball player
Donovan Mitchell, professional basketball player
Roberto Nurse, soccer player
Ben Oglivie, professional baseball player
Eusebio Pedroza, former world boxing champion
Jaime Penedo, soccer player
Blas Pérez, soccer player 
Laffit Pincay, Jr., horse jockey
Luis Antonio Rivera, soccer player
Mariano Rivera, professional baseball player
Rubén Rivera, professional baseball player
Humberto Robinson, major league baseball player
Davis Romero, professional baseball player
Carlos Ruiz, professional baseball player
Olmedo Sáenz, professional baseball player
Irving Saladino, former World and Olympic track and field champion
Manny Sanguillén, professional baseball player
Rennie Stennett, professional baseball player
Arturo Tejada, soccer player
Luis Tejada, soccer player
Ruben Tejada, professional baseball player
Román Torres, soccer player 
Roberto Vásquez, professional boxer
Roberto Wallace, professional football player
Oscar Willis Layne, cyclist
Hilario Zapata, professional boxer

Other
Princess Angela of Liechtenstein, member of the Royal House of Liechtenstein
Jorge Cham, webcomics producer, author of PhD Comics

 List